

Æthelweard (died between 909 and 926) was a medieval Bishop of London.

Æthelweard was consecrated between 909 and 926. He died between 909 and 926.

Citations

References

External links
 

Bishops of London
10th-century deaths
Year of birth unknown
Year of death unknown
10th-century English bishops